is a railway station on the Chuo Main Line in Kobuchisawa in the city of Hokuto, Yamanashi Prefecture, Japan, operated by East Japan Railway Company (JR East).

Lines
Kobuchizawa Station is served by the Chuo Main Line and is located 173.7 kilometers from the starting point of the line at Tokyo Station.

Station layout
Kobuchizawa Station has two island platforms connected to a wooden station building by a footbridge. The station has a "Midori no Madoguchi" staffed ticket office.

Platforms

History
The station opened on December 21, 1904 as a station on the Japanese Government Railways (JGR). The Koumi Line began operations from the station on July 27, 1933. The JGR became the Japanese National Railways (JNR) after the end of World War II.  With the dissolution and privatization of JNR on April 1, 1987, the station came under the control of the East Japan Railway Company (JR East).

The station has been rebuilt and opened in 2017, with the new structure, designed by architectural firm Atsushi Kitagawara Architects.

Passenger statistics
In fiscal 2019, the station was used by an average of 1,486 passengers daily (boarding passengers only).

Surrounding area
 Kobuchizawa Interchange on the Chuo Expressway
 Resort Outlets Yatsugatake shopping center
 Teikyo Daisan High School

Famous Ekiben
Awabi no takikomimeshi - abalone rice served inside a woven basket in the shape of a clamshell

See also
 List of railway stations in Japan

References
 Miyoshi Kozo. Chuo-sen Machi to eki Hyaku-niju nen. JT Publishing (2009)

External links

  

Railway stations in Yamanashi Prefecture
Chūō Main Line
Koumi Line
Railway stations in Japan opened in 1904
Hokuto, Yamanashi